Adriana Cristina Vasini Sánchez, (born July 30, 1987, in Maracaibo, Venezuela) is a Venezuelan model and beauty queen who won the titles of Miss World Venezuela 2009 and Reina Hispanoamericana 2009. She represented Venezuela in the Miss World 2010 on October 30, 2010 in Sanya, China and placed 2nd Runner-Up.

Early life
Vasini is the daughter of Pilar Sánchez, a former beauty pageant titleholder from Zulia.  She began modeling at age 16 for Maracaibo-based designer Miriam Rodriguez, and later with Douglas Tapia and Mayela Camacho. Prior to competing in Miss Venezuela 2009, she was studying Medicine at the University of Zulia in Maracaibo.

Miss World Venezuela 2009
A notable moment of her participation in Miss Venezuela 2009 came during the swimsuit segment when Vasini, in a calculated manner, dropped her wrap and picked it up with her right foot to the delight of the crowd.

Reina Hispanoamericana 2009
On October 29, 2009, she participated and captured the crown of the 2009 Reina Hispanoamericana pageant, held in Santa Cruz, Bolivia.

Miss World 2010
As the official representative of her country to the 2010 Miss World pageant held in Sanya, China, Vasini became one of the Top 20 finalists during the Miss World Top Model fast track event held on October 23, 2010 and a Top 10 finalist in Miss World Talent, held on October 26, 2010. She finished the competition placing second runner-up.

References

External links
Miss Venezuela Official Website
Miss World Official Website

1987 births
Living people
People from Maracaibo
Venezuelan female models
Miss Venezuela World winners
Miss World 2010 delegates
University of Zulia alumni